Per Nyman (born 14 February 1968) is a Swedish professional golfer.

Nyman was born in Kristianstad and attended Fresno State University in California, United States, where he twice won the GCAA All-America Scholar Award. He turned professional after graduating in 1992. He played on the European Tour and its official development tour, the Challenge Tour, between 1993 and 2004. He won four times on the Challenge Tour, including twice in 1995, and finished 2nd on the Challenge Tour Rankings in 1998. He was also medalist at the European Tour Qualifying School Final Stage in 2002.

He should not be confused with fellow professional golfer and two-time Challenge Tour winner Per G. Nyman.

Professional wins (5)

Challenge Tour wins (4)

Swedish Golf Tour wins (1)

Team appearances
Amateur
European Amateur Team Championship (representing Sweden): 1989
Eisenhower Trophy (representing Sweden): 1990 (winners)

See also
List of golfers with most Challenge Tour wins

References

External links

Swedish male golfers
Fresno State Bulldogs men's golfers
European Tour golfers
Sportspeople from Skåne County
People from Kristianstad Municipality
1968 births
Living people